Răscoala is a 1965 Romanian drama film directed by Mircea Mureșan based on a novel by Liviu Rebreanu about the Romanian peasant uprising of 1907. Mureșan won the prize for Best First Work at the 1966 Cannes Film Festival. It was the first Romanian film to be submitted to the Academy Award for Best Foreign Language Film. However, it failed to be nominated.

Cast
  (as Serafim Mogoș)
 Ion Besoiu (as Grigore Iuga)
 Adriana Bogdan (as Nadina)
 Emil Botta (as Anton Nebunul)
 Ilarion Ciobanu (as Petre Petre)
 Constantin Codrescu (as Baloleanu)
 Gheorghe Cozorici (as teacher Dragoș)
 Ernest Maftei (as Stan Marin)
 Ștefan Mihăilescu-Brăila (as Lupu Chirițoiu)
 Draga Olteanu-Matei (as Nadina's friend)
 Amza Pellea (as the military commander)
 Valentin Plătăreanu 
 Colea Răutu (as Cosma Butuc)
 Nicolae Secăreanu (as Miron Iuga)
  (as sergeant Boiangiu)
  (as Toader)

See also
 List of submissions to the 39th Academy Awards for Best Foreign Language Film
 List of Romanian submissions for the Academy Award for Best Foreign Language Film

References

External links

1965 films
1965 drama films
1960s Romanian-language films
Romanian black-and-white films
Films based on works by Liviu Rebreanu
Films directed by Mircea Mureşan
Films set in Romania
Films set in 1907
Romanian drama films